Jesús Aguilar Bueno (born 12 August 1968) is a Mexican politician affiliated with the Institutional Revolutionary Party. As of 2014 he served as Deputy of the LIX Legislature of the Mexican Congress representing Chihuahua (as independent).

References

1968 births
Living people
Politicians from Chihuahua (state)
Deputies of the LIX Legislature of Mexico
Institutional Revolutionary Party politicians
21st-century Mexican politicians
People from Ciudad Jiménez
Members of the Chamber of Deputies (Mexico) for Chihuahua (state)